Nicole Chung (born May 5, 1981) is an American writer and editor. She is the former managing editor of The Toast, the editor-in-chief of Catapult magazine, and the author of the memoir All You Can Ever Know.

Early life and education 
Chung was born in Seattle in 1981 to Korean parents who put her up for adoption after she spent months on life support. She was raised in Oregon by adoptive white Catholic parents. In her mid-20s Chung took a nonfiction class and started writing essays. She attended Johns Hopkins University, graduating with an undergraduate degree from the Krieger School of Arts & Sciences in 2003 and an MA in 2014.

, Chung lives in Washington D.C., with her husband Dan and two daughters.

Career 
Chung worked as the managing editor for The Toast from 2014 until the site closed in 2016, after which she became the editor-in-chief of Catapult magazine. She continued writing essays on topics involving gender, race, and media, such as the impact of seeing Asian American figure skater Kristi Yamaguchi on television and the experience of casual racism at dinner parties.

Her first book, a memoir titled All You Can Ever Know, was published by Catapult in 2018. The memoir follows Chung's own life story as well as the story of her birth sister, whom she met after reestablishing contact with their birth parents. The book is structured around Chung's efforts during her first pregnancy to reconstruct the story of her own origins, including searching for her birth family, contacting them, then discovering a history of abuse, divorce, and deception.

Writing for The Washington Post, Bethanne Patrick called All You Can Ever Know "one of this year’s finest books", while Publishers Weekly called it "vibrant and provocative". Katy Waldman of The New Yorker praised the book's "relatability" but noted that the characters are "sympathetic, but not particularly enthralling" and that she wanted "more surprise, more invention, from this book". Kate Tuttle of The Boston Globe summarized the book as "deeply thoughtful and moving" and "a fiercely compelling page-turner".

Works

References 

1981 births
Living people
21st-century American essayists
21st-century American women writers
American adoptees
American online publication editors
American women memoirists
21st-century American memoirists
American writers of Korean descent
Johns Hopkins University alumni
Writers from Oregon
Writers from Seattle
South Korean adoptees